The Second Coming is a two-part British television drama first screened on ITV in the United Kingdom in February 2003.  It concerns the realisation of humble video store worker Steve Baxter (played by Christopher Eccleston) that he is in fact the Son of God, and has just a few days to find the human race's Third Testament and thus avert the Apocalypse.

It was written by Russell T Davies (later head writer of the 2005 series of Doctor Who), and produced by the independent Red Production Company. The programme was originally commissioned as four one-hour episodes by Channel 4 in 1999; however, when new executives took over running the drama department at that channel, they decided not to pursue the project. Davies and Red's founder Nicola Shindler took the project to the BBC, who quickly turned it down; it found a home on ITV, a channel that had gained a reputation for producing mainstream, unchallenging, "middle-of-the-road" drama in recent years.

Screened over two successive evenings in prime time on Sunday and Monday, 9–10 February 2003, The Second Coming gained viewing figures of over six million. Davies, who is an atheist, has said his intention was to provoke debate and get people thinking about religion.

Plot

Steven Baxter, a good-hearted but slightly awkward video shop worker from Manchester, disappears for forty days and forty nights after a drunken night out with his friends to celebrate his best friend Judy's divorce, during which he shared a kiss with her. He is found wandering Saddleworth Moor, and he claims to be the second coming of Jesus. At first he is met with scepticism, and is even locked up. One of the few people who believes him is a young Catholic priest, who mentions an obscure Christian text that mentions that the lamb will be sent to the city of the North, followed by a series of numbers that turned out to be map co-ordinates. The recent death of the Pope is also seen as a sign. Steve escapes and, after one final night out before starting his duties, decides to indicate he is really the son of God to humanity by turning night into day over the small area of the football stadium at Maine Road (he lets people know about it by advertising on the internet). The feat attracts the attention of the world's media. Steve then announces he must find the third testament within five days. He states that humanity needs to start taking responsibility for their actions, and that everyone, regardless of their religion or origin, needs to begin again and forget past conflicts. He also says that Christians should not boast about being right, then reveals that currently Heaven is empty, while Hell is bursting at the seams.  There is much hysteria and panic; particularly when The Devil and several demons possess people (only indicated by silver eyes) to cause trouble. Satan takes possession of a man named Johnny Tyler that Judy met through a dating agency. He eventually reveals to Judy he wants Steve to fail and fall into despair, so that after Armageddon God will judge Steve's actions as a human and send him to hell, and they can rule together. In a deleted scene, it is revealed Satan also wants God to return to being the merciless, angry God of the Old Testament.

Later, it is revealed that Steve's earthly father could not have fathered him as he was born sterile, another indicator that Steve is really the son of God.

There is also media frenzy surrounding the events, especially after a tape is leaked of Steve saying that the world will end if the testament is not found, and he is taken into police protection. Some of Steve's friends accept him as the Messiah - Pete (who kept his Christianity hidden, not knowing how his friends would react) and Fiona (who becomes crazed, as this is the first time she has ever believed). Judy (an atheist), remains sceptical. She and Steve have some heated arguments (at one point, in a fit of anger, Steve is tempted to use his godly powers to kill her), especially as despite being the son of God, Steve is neither omniscient (relying on information "downloading" into his head, which frustrates him too) nor omnipotent (e.g., he cannot heal the sick). Steve later says that he does have powers, but he refuses to use them as he could get power mad, and reiterates it is up to humanity to sort themselves out this time. Judy is also confronted by several demons and manipulated into situations to get her to believe, which is part of Satan's plan to have Steve fall into despair.

During the next few days, Steve miraculously survives several attempts made on his life, including a bomb going off in a pub in which he is drinking. The devil and his demons also attempt to turn his father Frank against him, getting him hooked on drugs and alcohol and convincing him that he is now a joke in the public's eyes (one deleted scene saw him watching Bernard Manning on TV making jokes at his expense). Frank tries to shoot Steve, but ends up killing Pete. After her husband leaves her, Fiona attempts suicide and tries to kill her children too. Also during this time Judy and Steve's relationship grows deeper, and they have sex.

Steve himself has no idea what the third testament will be; he receives too many candidates to figure out which one is the real one. The Chief Superintendent of the police, who is also possessed by a demon, has them thrown out, saying that even if it were there, Steve would not be able to make his broadcast to the world. Having failed to discover the Testament, the people of the world hide in their homes, fearing the world's end.

Steve then visits Judy in hope of trying to work out what the testament is, and Judy reveals to him that it is the record she is making of events.  Judy, who is filmed night and day by cameras from the world's media around her house, makes spaghetti and laces it with rat poison, but announces this to Steve before presenting it to him. She states that it is Judgement Day, but for Steve and God, stating that it has been the existence of God or the argument about it which has led humanity to do so many bad things to one another. Steve is persuaded by Judy that he must die, and moreover make it permanent (in the sense of ceasing to exist rather than returning to heaven), so that humanity fights for itself rather than relying on the evils of fundamentalism. This will not only be the death of him, but of God, Satan, Heaven and Hell - the end of all religion. She also says that the absence of any kind of afterlife may scare people into living their lives properly.

Steve does not believe her at first, thinking she was influenced by the demons. He does one last divine "download" and, to his horror, realises that this is indeed the Third Testament, "the closing of the family business." He is scared at first, but then decides that it is time to die, and he eats his Last Supper. Henceforth, the world goes back to normal, with a few people referring to Judy as "the woman who killed God", but she otherwise goes back to living an ordinary insignificant life, having married the policeman who guarded her despite everyone else leaving their jobs and posts in fear of the apparent apocalypse. Judy sees Johnny Tyler (who has no memory of being possessed) and asks him if she did the right thing, but he cannot answer (suggesting that the audience needs to decide for itself whether she did or not).

An earlier draft of the script features a twist ending in which Judy is married to Steve, who has simply given up his divinity and become human again, with only her recognising him. However, Davies was advised against ending the story this way by his friend and fellow writer Paul Abbott, who felt that it cheated the audience.

Production

Davies originally conceived the idea for the programme while on a car journey from Manchester to Liverpool with his friend, the television producer Tony Wood. His initial pitch to Nicola Shindler described a scene from the second episode, with the Son of God having returned to Earth, made love to the woman he loves and her asking him if he loves her.

The eventual production for ITV was produced by Anne Harrison-Baxter and directed by Adrian Shergold, with Davies and Shindler as executive producers. Davies himself directed some of the second unit material featuring real-life television personalities such as Richard and Judy and Trisha Goddard commenting on Steven Baxter, seen throughout the programme along with news reports featuring real-life newsreaders such as Jon Snow and Krishnan Guru-Murthy. The bulk of filming took place during the summer of 2002.

The change from four one-hour episodes to two ninety-minute instalments necessitated the cutting of much material from what would originally have been episode three, the opening half of the eventual second episode. Most of this material centred around Steve's friends and family being tested by the devil's servants as well as Steve's mother, who in the final edit is removed altogether and referred to only as having died some time beforehand. Some of this material was shot, and the scenes that did not make the programme were included as bonus features on the DVD release of the serial, released the week after the programmes's UK broadcast. Also included on the disc was an audio commentary from Davies and Shergold.

The first episode, shown at 9pm on Sunday 9 February gained an average overnight viewing figure of 6.3 million, winning its timeslot ahead of the nearest competition, a documentary on the actor Christopher Reeve on BBC One, which gained 5.5 million, a 21% share. The second episode lost a sixth of its audience, with an average of 5.4 million viewers, beaten by the drama series In Deep on BBC One, which gained a figure of 6.6 million.

The Second Coming has also been shown in other countries – BBC America broadcast the drama in the United States in late 2003; it has also been seen in Canada on Showcase, in Australia on the ABC, and in New Zealand by TVNZ. Some versions shown overseas are shorter, with certain scenes cut and the ending coming after the 'documentary' scenes rather than the very final scene in the supermarket car park seen in the UK version.

Critical reception

Critical reaction to the production was generally positive. The Observer newspaper's reviewer, Kathryn Flett, said that "the boldness of the subject matter was complemented by a script of considerable depth and humour, and there were performances of Bafta-grabbing brilliance from everybody involved". She particularly praised the performances of the two leads: "Christopher Eccleston, never knowingly under-intense, was perfectly cast as the Everybloke suddenly gifted with the ability to provide answers to the big questions and perform medium-sized miracles... Sharp, burdened (or perhaps liberated?) by bad hair and make-up for most of the film proved herself yet again to be one of Britain's finest actresses."

In The Times, Paul Hoggart's verdict on the first episode was that: "It is intelligent, often amusing, and, at times, passionate and provocative. It throws down a gauntlet to religion, especially in tonight's conclusion, and something happens at the end which is probably deeply blasphemous... There are some clunks and bumps in the script, but most are smoothed over by excellent acting."

Writing in The Guardian to preview the drama before it aired, Mark Lawson said that: "Transmuting different genres like wine made from water — comedy into romance into thriller — Eccleston, Sharp, Davies and his director Adrian Shergold have created a world in which it soon ceases to seem odd that God chose Manchester. Steve only knows how they did it, but they have." Commenting on the US showing on BBC America, New York Magazine reviewer John Leonard called it "...an interesting argument about the cost benefits of the possible death of God. Rough, rude, and wonderfully acted."

The Second Coming featured in two major categories at the 2004 British Academy Television Awards, the most important TV awards ceremony in the UK. In the Best Actor category Christopher Eccleston lost out to Bill Nighy (for State of Play) while the production itself was beaten by Charles II: The Power and The Passion in the Best Drama Serial category.

Delivering the Huw Wheldon Lecture at the Royal Television Society's annual convention in Cambridge in September 2005, Paul Abbott praised The Second Coming as one of the few genuinely innovative British television drama productions of recent years, describing it as: "...a television masterpiece. It grappled with the most colossal subject matter in the return of a messiah to earth. Not in a Robert Powell way. Modern earth. Manchester, actually. And mainly the scruffy end."

Trivia
British electronica duo Orbital sampled the speech given by Steve Baxter (Christopher Eccleston) for the track "You Lot" on their 2004 Blue Album.

References

External links

2000s British drama television series
2003 British television series debuts
2003 British television series endings
Apocalyptic television series
British supernatural television shows
ITV television dramas
2000s British television miniseries
Television shows written by Russell T Davies
Television shows set in Manchester
Television series created by Russell T Davies
English-language television shows
British fantasy television series
Religious drama television series
Fiction about deicide
Films directed by Adrian Shergold